Alfhausen is a village in the collective municipality (Samtgemeinde) of Bersenbrück in the district of Osnabrück, Lower Saxony, Germany.

Geography

Location 
Alfhausen is located just under 27 km north of Osnabrück, and is in the north-west corner of Germany.

Climate 
The area has a mild maritime climate affected by the moist northwest wind from the North Sea. The average annual temperature in Alfhausen is 8.5° - 9.0 °C and average annual precipitation is around 700 mm. Between May and August there is an average of 20-25 "summer days" (the climatological name for days on which the maximum temperature exceeds 25 °C).

History 
Alfhausen was founded in 974. The name Alfhausen comes from the Low German and means "eleven houses". Its exact history is however unknown. The majority of the population is Roman Catholic. However, there are other religious communities in the town. In Early Modern times, the town came under the rule of the Kingdom of Hanover. 
Quite a number of its inhabitants emigrated to Baltimore and Cincinnati, Ohio & Northern Kentucky in the United States in the 1830s to 1860s.

Sights 

In 1971, the Alfsee lake was created as a flood control storage basin for the River Hase; it was named after its closeness to the municipality of Alfhausen. As a popular destination for holiday makers and day trippers, the lake has gained great importance in recent years. The retention basin was extended in the 1990s by a second, in order to hold water from a larger catchment area.

The newly renovated Church of St John, built in the 13th century, is popular with couples getting married. Its interior partly dates to the Gothic era, for example the Bentheim font and the Madonna.

There are a number of 16th-century buildings in the old village centre.

References 

Osnabrück (district)